Ichi Daraq (also Romanized as Īchī Daraq) is a village in Keyvan Rural District, in the Central District of Khoda Afarin County, East Azerbaijan Province, Iran. At the 2006 census, its population was 10, in 4 families.

References 

Populated places in Khoda Afarin County